The Women's Society of Belgrade (Београдско женско друштво) was a Serbian women's rights organisation, founded in 1875 and active until 1941. Its purpose was to work for the emancipation of women as well as patriotic charity.

History
The society was founded in 1875 by Katarina Milovuk.  

The society was primarily focused on humanitarian issues such as helping poor women and children (particularly war orphans), but it combined it with women's issues. It supported women's emancipation and suffrage and included work shops, schooling and vocational training and employment agencies for women and girls, and founded the first women's magazine in Serbia. 

It was to be the dominating women's organisation in Serbia until the establishment of the Circle of Serbian Sisters in 1903. After the second world war, both women's societies were replaced by the Women's Antifascist Front of Yugoslavia.

See also
 Circle of Serbian Sisters
 Women's Antifascist Front of Yugoslavia

References 

Voter rights and suffrage organizations
1875 establishments in Europe
Women's organizations based in Serbia
Women's rights organizations
Feminism in Serbia